Walter Norborne (18 November 1655 – September 1684) was an English politician who sat in the House of Commons  in 1679 and from 1681 to 1684.  He was killed in a duel at the age of 28.

Norborne was the son of Walter Norborne of Hilmarton and his wife Mary Chivers, daughter of Henry Chivers of Quemerford and his wife Elizabeth Seacole of Milton, Oxfordshire. His father was a Royalist MP for Calne.

In February 1679, Norborne was elected Member of Parliament for Calne and sat until August 1679. In 1681 he was re-elected MP for Calne and sat until his death in 1684.

Norborne was killed in a duel with an Irishman at the fountain at Middle Temple in September 1684.

Norborne married Frances Bacon, daughter of Sir Edmund Bacon and his wife Elizabeth Crane.  He left two daughters, Elizabeth who married Edward Devereux, Viscount Hereford and Susan who married Sir Ralph Hare. The family estate was divided equally between them.

References

1655 births
1684 deaths
People from Calne
Duelling fatalities
Place of birth missing
English MPs 1679
English MPs 1681